Potts may refer to:

Arts and entertainment
Doc Potts, animated television series
Tom Potts, Child ballad 109
The Potts, said to be the world's longest-running cartoon strip drawn by the same artist

Mathematics
Potts model, model of interacting spins on a crystalline lattice
Cellular Potts model, lattice-based computational modeling method to simulate the collective behavior of cellular structures
Chiral Potts curve, algebraic curve defined over the complex numbers that occurs in the study of the chiral Potts model of statistical mechanics

Places
Black Potts Ait, island in the River Thames in England 
Mount Potts, a skiing base in South Island, New Zealand
Potts Camp, Mississippi, United States
Potts, Missouri, an unincorporated community
Potts, Nevada, a ghost town in the United States
Potts Creek, Virginia, United States
Potts Hill, New South Wales a suburb in south-western Sydney, Australia
Potts Point, New South Wales, a suburb of inner Sydney, Australia

Other
 Potts (surname)
 Potts of Leeds, major British manufacturer of public clocks, based in Leeds, UK

See also
 Pott (surname)
 Pottery, pots
 POTS (disambiguation), various uses